The Blyde River Canyon is a 26km long Canyon located in Mpumalanga, South Africa. It is the one of the larger canyons on Earth but much smaller than those of Asia, the Grand Canyon and the Fish River Canyon. Unlike the Grand and Fish River Canyon, the Blyde River Canyon is a "green canyon" which is dominated by subtropical vegetation. The canyon forms part of the Blyde River Canyon Nature Reserve.

The Blyde River Canyon passes a rock formation known as the "Three Rondavels". So named as the formation resembles three African-style houses or rondavels. This canyon is part of the Panorama Route. This route starts at the town Graskop and includes God's Window, the Pinnacle and Bourke's Luck Potholes.

Name

The canyon is named for the river that runs through it, the Blyde River, now called the Motlatse River. Blyde means "glad" or "happy" in old Dutch, a name derived from a voortrekkers' expedition. The 'happy river' was thus named in 1844, when Hendrik Potgieter and others returned safely from Delagoa Bay to the rest of their party of trekkers who had considered them dead. While still under this misapprehension they had named the nearby river where they had been encamped, Treurrivier, or 'mourning river'.

In 2005, the Blyde River was renamed to the Motlatse River, and the Mpumalanga Provincial Government announced that the canyon would be renamed as well.

Fauna and flora

The Blyde River Canyon supports large diversity of life, including numerous fish and antelope species as well as hippos and crocodiles, and every primate species that may be seen in South Africa (including both greater and lesser bushbabies, vervet monkeys and Samango monkeys). The diversity of birdlife is similarly high, including the beautiful and much sought Narina trogon as well as species such as the Cape vulture, black eagle, crowned eagle, African fish eagle, gymnogene, jackal buzzard, white-rumped vulture, bald ibis, African finfoot, Knysna lourie, purple-crested lourie, Gurney's sugarbird, malachite sunbird, cinnamon dove, African emerald cuckoo, red-backed mannikin, golden-tailed woodpecker, olive bush shrike, green twinspot, Taita falcons (very rarely sighted, a breeding pair lives in the nearby Abel Erasmus Pass), Cape eagle owl, white-faced owl, wood owl, peregrine falcon, black-breasted snake eagle, Wahlberg's eagle, long-crested eagle, lanner falcon, red-breasted sparrowhawk, rock kestrel and others.

Kadishi waterfall

At , the Kadishi Tufa waterfall is the second tallest tufa waterfall on earth. A tufa waterfall is formed when water running over dolomite rock absorbs calcium, and deposits rock formations more rapidly than they erode the surrounding rock. In the case of the Kadishi Tufa fall, the formation that has been produced strikingly resembles a face which is crying profusely, and is thus sometimes known as 'the weeping face of nature'.

Tourism 

The canyon and the surrounding Drakensberg escarpment is a very popular tourist region with a well-developed tourism industry supported by good public infrastructure.

References

External links

 The Panorama (including the Blyde River Canyon) on Mpumalanga Tourism

Landforms of Mpumalanga
Protected areas of Mpumalanga
Canyons and gorges of South Africa
Tourist attractions in Mpumalanga